Dawson Walker (14 March 1916 – 17 August 1973) was manager of the Scotland national football team in 1958. Walker was left in charge of the players due to the Munich air disaster, in which official manager Matt Busby was seriously injured.

Managerial statistics

References

External links 
 

1916 births
1973 deaths
Scottish football managers
Scotland national football team managers
1958 FIFA World Cup managers
Clyde F.C. non-playing staff
Sportspeople from Dundee
Place of death missing